Drums of Love (1928) is a silent romance film directed by D. W. Griffith.

Plot
After finding out her father and his estate is in danger, Princess Emanuella saves his life by marrying Duke Cathos de Alvia, a grotesque hunchback. She actually is in love with Leonardo, his attractive younger brother. They already had an affair before the marriage, but continue secretly meeting each other. In the end, Cathos finds out about his wife's unfaithfulness and stabs both his wife and brother to death.

Cast
Mary Philbin as Princess Emanuella
Lionel Barrymore as Duke Cathos de Alvia
Don Alvarado as Count Leonardo de Alvia
Tully Marshall as Bopi
William Austin as Raymond of Boston
Eugenie Besserer as Duchess de Alvia
Charles Hill Mailes Duke de Granada
Rosemary Cooper as The Maid
Joyce Coad as The Little Sister

Production
The film was a modernized adaption of a Francesca da Rimini opera. The settings were changed from 14th century Italy to 19th century South America. The film was directed by D. W. Griffith, whose career was in decline. He imposed a happy ending, but this idea was rejected.

The female lead went to Mary Philbin, who was on a loan from another studio, (Universal). Cinematographer Karl Struss was especially impressed with the actress and tested her two weeks for different wigs. Philbin later called working with Griffith like a 'dream come true'.

Reception
The film was received as one of D. W. Griffith's weakest. Critics agreed that Griffith did not know how to handle the film's theme and story the way Tod Browning could have. Both the critics and the audience agreed that the poor reception was mainly due to the ending.

See also
D. W. Griffith filmography
Lionel Barrymore filmography

References

External links

1928 films
American black-and-white films
American silent feature films
Films directed by D. W. Griffith
Films set in the 19th century
Films set in South America
Films based on operas
American romantic drama films
1928 romantic drama films
Films based on Inferno (Dante)
1920s American films
Silent romantic drama films
Silent American drama films